Joan Shepherd (5 May 1924 – 24 November 2012) was a British athlete. She competed in the women's long jump at the 1948 Summer Olympics.

References

1924 births
2012 deaths
Athletes (track and field) at the 1948 Summer Olympics
British female long jumpers
Olympic athletes of Great Britain
Place of birth missing